'Insensitivity' (sensi'tivitē) refers to a lack of sensitivity for other's feelings. It may also refer to:

 "Insensitive" (song), a 1995 song by Canadian singer Jann Arden
 Insensitive (House), an episode of the TV series House
 Culturally insensitive

See also 
 Insensibility (disambiguation)
 Senseless (disambiguation)